Rana Pourarab Farahanipour is an award winner Iranian-American Pastry Chef.

Early life and career 
Rana Pourarab Farahanipour was born in Tehran, Iran. She completed high-school school in Tehran after which she moved to United States with her to join her mom Sima in 2002. She attended college in Los Angeles. 

In April 2015, Rana launched the brand CookChe. On June 30, 2022 Rana and Roozbeh Farahanipour launched Persian Gulf Restaurant in Westwood, California. She is the host of the weekly cooking program on KIRN radio.

Personal life 
Rana is married to Roozbeh Farahanipour.

References 

Living people
People from Tehran
American chefs